John Henry St Pierre, a.k.a. John War Eagle (8 June 1901 – 7 February 1991) was a Yankton Sioux film and television actor. He was born September 24, 1901, in Wagner, Charles Mix, South Dakota. He is Dakota of the Sioux people and was raised on the Yankton Indian Reservation in South Dakota. He is often confused with a John War Eagle born 1902 in the U.K.

Career
Between 1932 and 1977 — sometimes credited as Chief John War Eagle, Chief John Eagle or John Wareagle — he appeared in twenty-eight films, mostly in uncredited roles, and twenty-six television productions.

His roles include appearing as Red Cloud in the historical western-drama film Tomahawk (1951) starring Van Heflin, a role he reprised in 1953 in historical western-drama film The Great Sioux Uprising starring Jeff Chandler.  He also played Chief Sitting Bull in the Disney family, adventure, western-drama film Tonka (1958), the story of a young Sioux boy, played by Sal Mineo on the brink of adulthood who tries to tame a wild stallion to prove his courage and strength.

War Eagle also appeared as Wolf's Brother in Disney western-drama film Westward Ho, the Wagons! (1956) & in “The Jeremy Dow Story” (S4E14) as revengeful “Chief Iron Hand” in the TV Western Wagon Train (1960).

References

External links

Native American male actors
20th-century Native Americans
20th-century American male actors
American male television actors
American male film actors
1902 births
1991 deaths